Clara Brown (c. 1800–1885) was a former enslaved woman from Virginia and Kentucky who became a community leader, philanthropist and aided settlement of former slaves during the time of Colorado's Gold Rush. She was known as the 'Angel of the Rockies' and made her mark as Colorado's first black settler and a prosperous entrepreneur.

Brown was born in Virginia in 1800  and moved to Logan County, Kentucky, with her family. She married another enslaved person when she was 18 and together they had four children.  In 1835, Brown's family was broken apart when they were all sold to different slave owners. When Brown was 56, she received her freedom but was required by law to leave the state. She worked her way west as a cook and laundress to Denver, Colorado.

Brown settled in the mining town now called Central City, Colorado where she worked as a laundress, cook, and midwife.   With the money she made, she invested in properties and mines in nearby towns.   Known as "Aunt Clara" for her emotional and financial support, Brown was a founding member of a Sunday school, made her home available for prayer services and generously supported the community.

At the end of the Civil War, Brown could freely travel and liquidated all of her investments to travel to Kentucky to find her daughter.  Although she was unsuccessful, she paid the way for 16 or more relatives and others who were former slaves to move to Colorado.  Finally, in 1882 she reunited with her daughter Eliza Jane and Eliza Jane's daughter.  In 1885, the last year of her life, Clara Brown was voted into the Society of Colorado Pioneers for her role in Colorado's early history.

Early life 
Clara Brown was born into slavery near Independence, Missouri on January 1, 1800.  At a young age Clara and her mother were sold to Adam Smith, a Virginian tobacco farmer, and worked in the fields.  She was then moved with the Smith family to Kentucky.

Clara married a slave named Richard at 18 years of age. Together they had four children: Richard, Margaret, Paulina Ann, and Eliza Jane.  Sadly at 8 years of age Paulina, the twin sister to Eliza Jane drowned.  In 1835 their owner, Ambrose Smith, died.  To settle the estate, Brown's family was brought to a slave auction, sold separately and sent to different, distant locations.  A plantation owner from Kentucky, George Brown, sensed her intelligence and strength and placed high bids to attain her.

Freedom 

At the age of 56, Clara Brown was granted her freedom, as stipulated in George Brown's will. She left the state upon receiving her freedom according to a Kentucky law.

Kentucky to Colorado
Brown was hired as a maid and cook by a family heading to the westward departure point of Leavenworth Kansas Territory.  From there Brown was hired by Colonel Benjamin Wadsworth in April 1859 to work on the wagon train as a cook for 26 men.  It was a hot, difficult eight-week journey to Denver, Colorado, made more uncomfortable by the complaints of a southern man about a black woman traveling with them. Brown is believed to be Colorado’s gold rush first African American woman.

Denver and Central City
 In the Denver area, Brown settled in nearby Auraria where she worked at the City Bakery.  She was one of the founding members of the nondenominational Union Sunday school through her affiliation with two Methodist missionary ministers.  Following the tide of miners heading into the mountains, Brown set up the first laundry in Gilpin County in Gregory Gulch, now called Central City, Colorado.  She also worked as a midwife, cook and nursemaid.  Brown's income grew substantially when she expanded her laundry business after taking a partner.  She invested her earnings in mine claims and land and within several years had accumulated $10,000 in savings and reportedly owned 16 lots in Denver, 7 houses in Central City, and property and mines in Boulder, Georgetown, and Idaho Springs.

 Brown gave generously of herself to those in the community.  She hosted the first Methodist church services at her house and helped those in need any way she could, whether newly settled Euro-Americans or Native Americans.  Lovingly called "Aunt Clara," her home was, "a hospital, a home, a general refuge for those who were sick or in poverty."  She was quoted as saying, "I always go where Jesus calls me." The Catholic Church and the first Protestant church in the Rocky Mountains were built partly through Brown's donations toward their construction.

 Frank C. Young, who some called the Washington Irving of the Rockies said of Brown:
In our little community everyone knew everyone else, whatever might be the positive differences in social position.  In this connection, I might speak of Aunt Clara Brown.  She was raised in old Kentucky, and with, she won freedom secured after years of persistent, patient toil, when well along in life she joined the procession of gold seekers to Gregory Gulch.  Through the unusual returns of a mining camp for labor such as hers, she was able to bring out from the old plantation her children and later her children’s children [relatives]; and with them, whether aided by her efforts or stimulated by her example, have, year by year, come many others of her race, worthily represented by the Pointers, the Lees, the Nelsons and other families who are as tenacious of recognition as subjects of the 'little kingdom' as you or I may be.

Attempts to find her family and aid to former slaves
 Letters were sent to locate her family with the aid of friends who could write.  Brown heard that her husband Richard and daughter Margaret had both died and her son Richard was lost, but she vowed to find her daughter Eliza Jane.  At the end of the Civil War, she liquidated her holdings to travel back to Gallatin, Kentucky.  She didn't find Eliza Jane, but she helped 16 (or 26) relatives and others who were former slaves travel to Colorado by train and wagon train and helped them find work once they were settled.  Brown also went to Kansas in 1879 to help former slaves "build a community and farm the land."  At eighty years of age, Brown's funds were depleted through charitable contributions, her efforts to find her family, and having been cheated by real estate agents.

 Brown moved to Denver when she could no longer sustain the higher altitude and lived in the home of a friend.  After years of writing letters, Brown heard that her daughter lived in Council Bluffs, Iowa and traveled there at 82 years of age to meet her.  The Council Bluffs Nonpareil reported on March 4, 1882, that Brown was "still strong, vigorous, tall, her hair thickly streaked with gray, her face kind."  Brown returned to Denver with her granddaughter after a lengthy visit and was later visited by her daughter, Eliza Jane, until Brown's death.  In remembrance of her pioneering role in Colorado history, she was voted into the Society of Colorado Pioneers and interviewed by the Denver Tribune-Republican on June 26, 1885.

Death and memorials
Clara Brown died in Denver on October 23, 1885 and was buried in Denver's Riverside Cemetery.  Colorado state dignitaries were in attendance at her funeral, including Denver mayor John Long Routt and governor James Benton Grant. The Central City Opera House dedicated a permanent memorial chair in her name.

 Brown is the subject of the opera Gabriel's Daughter by Henry Mollicone and William Luce, which premiered at Central City Opera in 2003.

 Brown was inducted into the Colorado Women's Hall of Fame in 1989.

See also
 History of slavery in Colorado
 List of African American pioneers of Colorado

Notes

References 
 Clara Brown Biography (1800-1885). Biography Channel. A&E Network. Retrieved 13 June 2011.
 Colorado Women's Hall of Fame, Clara Brown.  Colorado Women's Hall of Fame. 2011. Retrieved 13 June 2011.
 Hill, A. (1915).  Colorado pioneers in picture and story. Denver: Brock-Hafner Press.
 Katz, W. (1995) Black Women of the Old West. Chapter 7, Clara Brown of Colorado. New York: Antheum Books for Young Readers, Simon and Schuster. .
 Reiter, Joan S. (1978). The Old West: The Women. Time-Life Books 
 Varnell, Jeanne (1999). Women of Consequence: The Colorado Women's Hall of Fame. Boulder: Johnson Press. .
 Wishart, David J. (2004). "Brown, "Aunt" Clara". Encyclopedia of the Great Plains. University of Nebraska Press. .

1800 births
1885 deaths
19th-century American slaves
Colorado Mining Boom
Society of Colorado Pioneers
People from Central City, Colorado
American midwives
People from Denver
Cowgirl Hall of Fame inductees
African-American history of Colorado
19th-century African-American women